DOCB may refer to:

 Dictionary of Canadian Biography
 Drugs and Organised Crime Bureau of the Irish police
 Dr. Obote College Boroboro, a school in Uganda
 .docb, a Microsoft Word file extension